Cybaeus is a genus of araneomorph spiders in the family Cybaeidae, first described by Ludwig Carl Christian Koch in 1868. It is found in America, Europe, Japan, Korea and China. Females of different species are difficult to distinguish, especially in North America. Images of males that include pedipalps are the easiest to determine species.

Species 
 it contains 198 species:

 Cybaeus abchasicus Charitonov, 1947 — Turkey, Caucasus (Russia, Georgia)
 Cybaeus adenes Chamberlin & Ivie, 1932 — USA
 Cybaeus aikana Ihara, Koike & Nakano, 2021 — Japan (Ryukyu Is.)
 Cybaeus aizuensis Kobayashi, 2006 — Japan
 Cybaeus akaanaensis Ihara, 1968) — Japan
 Cybaeus akiensis Ihara, 2003 — Japan
 Cybaeus amamiensis Ihara, Koike & Nakano, 2021 — Japan (Ryukyu Is.)
 Cybaeus amicus Chamberlin & Ivie, 1932 — USA
 Cybaeus anaiwaensis Ihara, 1968) — Japan
 Cybaeus angustiarum L. Koch, 1868 — Europe
 Cybaeus aokii Yaginuma, 1972 — Japan
 Cybaeus aquilonalis Yaginuma, 1958 — China, Japan
 Cybaeus aratrum Kim & Kim, 2008 — Korea
 Cybaeus asahi Kobayashi, 2006 — Japan
 Cybaeus ashikitaensis Ihara, 1968) — Japan
 Cybaeus aspenicolens Chamberlin & Ivie, 1932 — USA
 Cybaeus auburn Bennett, 2019 — USA
 Cybaeus auriculatus Seo, 2017 — Korea
 Cybaeus balkanus Deltshev, 1997 — Bulgaria, Serbia, North Macedonia
 Cybaeus bam Marusik & Logunov, 1991 — Russia (Kurile Is.)
 Cybaeus basarukini Marusik & Logunov, 1991 — Russia (Sakhalin)
 Cybaeus bilectus Bennett, 2021 — USA
 Cybaeus bitchuensis Ihara & Nojima, 2005 — Japan
 Cybaeus biwaensis Kobayashi, 2006 — Japan
 Cybaeus blasbes Chamberlin & Ivie, 1932 — USA
 Cybaeus brignolii Maurer, 1992 — Turkey
 Cybaeus broni Caporiacco, 1934 — Karakorum
 Cybaeus bryoncavus Bennett, 2021 — USA
 Cybaeus bulbosus Exline, 1935 — USA
 Cybaeus cascadius Roth, 1952 — USA
 Cybaeus charlesi Bennett, 2016 — USA, Canada
 Cybaeus chauliodous Bennett, 2009 — USA
 Cybaeus communis Yaginuma, 1972 — Japan
 Cybaeus confrantis Oliger, 1994 — Russia (Far East)
 Cybaeus conservans Chamberlin & Ivie, 1932 — USA
 Cybaeus consocius Chamberlin & Ivie, 1932 — USA
 Cybaeus constrictus Chamberlin & Ivie, 1942 — USA
 Cybaeus coylei Bennett, 2021 — USA
 Cybaeus cribelloides Chamberlin & Ivie, 1932 — USA
 Cybaeus culter Lee, Yoo & Kim, 2021 — Korea
 Cybaeus cylisteus Zhu & Wang, 1992 — China
 Cybaeus daimonji Matsuda, Ihara & Nakano, 2020 — Japan
 Cybaeus daisen Ihara & Nojima, 2005 — Japan
 Cybaeus deletroneus Zhu & Wang, 1992 — China
 Cybaeus desmaeus Zhu & Wang, 1992 — China
 Cybaeus devius Chamberlin & Ivie, 1942 — USA
 Cybaeus echigo Kobayashi, 2006 — Japan
 Cybaeus echinaceus Zhu & Wang, 1992 — China
 Cybaeus echo Bennett, 2021 — USA
 Cybaeus enshu Kobayashi, 2006 — Japan
 Cybaeus eutypus Chamberlin & Ivie, 1932 — USA, Canada
 Cybaeus fraxineus Bennett, 2021 — USA
 Cybaeus fujisanus Yaginuma, 1972 — Japan
 Cybaeus fushun Lin & Li, 2021 — China, Russia (Far East)
 Cybaeus fuujinensis Ihara, 1968) — Japan
 Cybaeus gassan Kobayashi, 2006 — Japan
 Cybaeus geumensis Seo, 2016 — Korea
 Cybaeus gidneyi Bennett, 2009 — USA
 Cybaeus giganteus	Banks, 1892 — USA
 Cybaeus gonokawa Ihara, 1993 — Japan
 Cybaeus gotoensis	(Yamaguchi & Yaginuma, 1971) — Japan
 Cybaeus grizzlyi Schenkel, 1950 — USA
 Cybaeus harrietae Bennett, 2016 — USA
 Cybaeus hatsushibai Ihara, 2005 — Japan
 Cybaeus hesper Chamberlin & Ivie, 1932 — USA
 Cybaeus hibaensis Ihara, 1994 — Japan
 Cybaeus higoensis Irie & Ono, 2000 — Japan
 Cybaeus hikidai Ihara, Koike & Nakano, 2021 — Japan (Ryukyu Is.)
 Cybaeus hiroshimaensis Ihara, 1993 — Japan
 Cybaeus huadian Lin & Li, 2021 — China, Russia (Far East)
 Cybaeus hummeli Bennett, 2021 — USA
 Cybaeus iharai Sugawara, Koike & Nakano, 2022 — Japan
 Cybaeus ilweolensis Seo, 2016 — Korea
 Cybaeus inagakii Ono, 2008 — Japan
 Cybaeus intermedius Maurer, 1992 — France, Switzerland, Italy
 Cybaeus irreverens Bennett, 2022 — USA
 Cybaeus ishikawai (Kishida, 1940) — Japan
 Cybaeus itsukiensis Irie, 1998 — Japan
 Cybaeus jaanaensis Komatsu, 1968 — Japan
 Cybaeus jilinensis Song, Kim & Zhu, 1993 — China
 Cybaeus jinsekiensis Ihara, 2006 — Japan
 Cybaeus jiriensis Seo, 2016 — Korea
 Cybaeus jogyensis Seo, 2016 — Korea
 Cybaeus kawabensis Irie & Ono, 2002 — Japan
 Cybaeus kiiensis Kobayashi, 2006 — Japan
 Cybaeus kirigaminensis Komatsu, 1963 — Japan
 Cybaeus kiuchii Komatsu, 1965 — Japan
 Cybaeus kodama Ihara, Koike & Nakano, 2021 — Japan (Ryukyu Is.)
 Cybaeus koikei Sugawara, Ihara & Nakano, 2021 — Japan
 Cybaeus kokuraensis Ihara, 2007 — Japan
 Cybaeus kompiraensis Ihara, 1968) — Japan
 Cybaeus kumadori Ihara, Koike & Nakano, 2021 — Japan (Ryukyu Is.)
 Cybaeus kumaensis Irie & Ono, 2001 — Japan
 Cybaeus kunashirensis Marusik & Logunov, 1991 — Russia (Sakhalin, Kurile Is.), Japan
 Cybaeus kunisakiensis Ihara, 2003 — Japan
 Cybaeus kuramotoi Yaginuma, 1963 — Japan
 Cybaeus lockeae Bennett, 2022 — USA
 Cybaeus logunovi Marusik & Omelko, 2022 — Russia (Far East)
 Cybaeus longus Paik, 1966 — Korea
 Cybaeus magnus Yaginuma, 1958 — Japan
 Cybaeus maritimus Marusik & Omelko, 2022 — Russia (Far East)
 Cybaeus melanoparvus Kobayashi, 2006 — Japan
 Cybaeus mellotteei (Simon, 1886) — Japan
 Cybaeus mikhailovi Marusik & Omelko, 2021 — Russia (Far East)
 Cybaeus mimasaka Ihara & Nojima, 2005 — Japan
 Cybaeus minoensis Kobayashi, 2006 — Japan
 Cybaeus minor Chyzer, 1897 — Europe
 Cybaeus miyagiensis Ihara, 2004 — Japan
 Cybaeus miyosii Yaginuma, 1941 — Japan
 Cybaeus momotaro Ihara & Nojima, 2005 — Japan
 Cybaeus montanus Maurer, 1992 — Switzerland, Italy
 Cybaeus monticola Kobayashi, 2006 — Japan
 Cybaeus morosus Simon, 1886 — USA, Canada
 Cybaeus mosanensis Paik & Namkung, 1967 — Korea
 Cybaeus multnoma Chamberlin & Ivie, 1942 — USA
 Cybaeus nagaiae Ihara, 2010 — Japan
 Cybaeus nagusa Ihara, 2010 — Japan
 Cybaeus nichikoensis Ihara, 1968) — Japan
 Cybaeus nipponicus (Uyemura, 1938) — Japan
 Cybaeus nishikawai Ihara, 1968) — Japan
 Cybaeus nojimai Ihara, 1993 — Japan
 Cybaeus obedientiarius Komatsu, 1963 — Japan
 Cybaeus odaensis Seo, 2016 — Korea
 Cybaeus okafujii Yaginuma, 1963 — Japan
 Cybaeus okayamaensis Ihara, 1993 — Japan
 Cybaeus okumae Ihara, 2010 — Japan
 Cybaeus okumurai Ihara, Koike & Nakano, 2021 — Japan (Ryukyu Is.)
 Cybaeus oligerae Marusik & Omelko, 2022 — Russia (Far East)
 Cybaeus opulentus Bennett, 2021 — USA
 Cybaeus orarius Bennett, 2021 — USA
 Cybaeus pan Bennett, 2021 — USA
 Cybaeus paralypropriapus Bennett, 2009 — USA
 Cybaeus parvus Seo, 2017 — Korea
 Cybaeus patritus Bishop & Crosby, 1926 — USA
 Cybaeus pearcei Bennett, 2019 — USA
 Cybaeus penedentatus Bennett, 2009 — USA
 Cybaeus petegarinus Yaginuma, 1972 — Japan
 Cybaeus piazzai Bennett, 2021 — USA
 Cybaeus pseudoauriculatus Lee, Yoo & Kim, 2021 — Korea
 Cybaeus rarispinosus Yaginuma, 1970 — Japan
 Cybaeus raymondi (Simon, 1916) — Pyrenees (Spain, France)
 Cybaeus reducens Chamberlin & Ivie, 1932 — USA
 Cybaeus reticulatus Simon, 1886 — USA, Canada
 Cybaeus rothi Bennett, 2016 — USA
 Cybaeus ryunoiwayaensis Komatsu, 1968 — Japan
 Cybaeus ryusenensis Ihara, 1968) — Japan
 Cybaeus sanbruno Bennett, 2009 — USA
 Cybaeus sanctus Ihara, 1942) — Japan
 Cybaeus sasakii Ihara, 2004 — Japan
 Cybaeus sasayamaensis Ihara, 2010 — Japan
 Cybaeus schusteri Bennett, 2019 — USA
 Cybaeus scopulatus Chamberlin & Ivie, 1942 — USA
 Cybaeus senzokuensis Ihara, 1968) — Japan
 Cybaeus seorakensis Seo, 2016 — Korea
 Cybaeus septatus Chamberlin & Ivie, 1942 — USA
 Cybaeus shingenni Komatsu, 1968 — Japan
 Cybaeus shinkaii Ihara, 1970) — Japan
 Cybaeus shoshoneus Chamberlin & Ivie, 1932 — USA
 Cybaeus signatus Keyserling, 1881 — Peru
 Cybaeus signifer Simon, 1886 — USA, Canada
 Cybaeus silicis Barrows, 1919 — USA
 Cybaeus simplex Roth, 1952 — USA
 Cybaeus sinuosus Fox, 1937 — Canada
 Cybaeus solanum Bennett, 2016 — USA
 Cybaeus somesbar Bennett, 2009 — USA
 Cybaeus songniensis Seo, 2016 — Korea
 Cybaeus strandi Kolosváry, 1934 — Romania
 Cybaeus striatipes Bösenberg & Strand, 1906 — Russia (Sakhalin, Kurile Is.), Japan
 Cybaeus tajimaensis Ihara & Nojima, 2005 — Japan
 Cybaeus takachihoensis Irie & Ono, 2010 — Japan
 Cybaeus takasawaensis Ihara, 1970) — Japan
 Cybaeus taraensis Irie & Ono, 2001 — Japan
 Cybaeus tardatus (Chamberlin, 1919) — USA
 Cybaeus tetricus (C. L. Koch, 1839) — Europe
 Cybaeus thermydrinos Bennett, 2009 — USA
 Cybaeus tokunoshimensis Ihara, Koike & Nakano, 2021 — Japan (Ryukyu Is.)
 Cybaeus topanga Bennett, 2021 — USA
 Cybaeus torosus Bennett, 2019 — USA
 Cybaeus tottoriensis Ihara, 1994 — Japan
 Cybaeus triangulus Paik, 1966 — Korea
 Cybaeus tsurugi Ihara, 2003 — Japan
 Cybaeus tsurusakii Ihara, 1993 — Japan
 Cybaeus ubicki Bennett, 2021 — USA
 Cybaeus uenoi (Yaginuma, 1970) — Japan
 Cybaeus urabandai Ihara, 2004 — Japan
 Cybaeus vanimaculatus Lee, Yoo & Kim, 2021 — Korea
 Cybaeus viator Bennett, 2022 — USA
 Cybaeus vignai Brignoli, 1977 — France, Italy
 Cybaeus vulpinus Bennett, 2009 — USA
 Cybaeus waynei Bennett, 2009 — USA
 Cybaeus whanseunensis Paik & Namkung, 1967 — Korea
 Cybaeus wilsonia Bennett, 2021 — USA
 Cybaeus yakushimensis Ihara, Koike & Nakano, 2021 — Japan (Ryukyu Is.)
 Cybaeus yeongwolensis Lee, Yoo & Kim, 2021 — Korea
 Cybaeus yoshiakii Yaginuma, 1968 — Japan
 Cybaeus yoshidai Ihara, 2004 — Japan
 Cybaeus yufuin Ihara, 2007 — Japan
 Cybaeus zenifukiensis Ihara, 1968) — Japan

References

External links 

Cybaeidae
Araneomorphae genera